The Sangguniang Kabataan Baguio City Federation is a special youth legislature that initiates programs, policies, and projects for youth development. It is composed of 124 members serving as SK Chairmen of their respective barangays.

References

External links
SK holds basketball tilt
SKF asks 2500 year end bonus for SK Kagawads
SK Special polls held in 79 barangays

Local government in Baguio
Youth councils
Katipunan ng Kabataan